Odense Station is the main railway station serving the city of Odense, Denmark.

Situated as a major station on the Copenhagen–Fredericia/Taulov line, it is also the terminus of the Svendborgbanen railway line between Odense and Svendborg. The first station in Odense, now demolished, opened in 1865 as the railway line across the island of Funen was completed. The current station building opened in 1995.

History 

The current station building is Odense's third, having opened on 15 September 1995. The first one, now demolished, opened in 1865 with the rest of the railway line across Funen (Dronning Louises Jernbane). The first station building was designed by the Danish architect Niels Peder Christian Holsøe, known for the numerous station buildings he designed across Denmark in his capacity of head architect of the Danish State Railways.

The first station was replaced in 1914 by the still-existing building drawn by Heinrich Wenck.

Historically, Odense station has been the central hub of railways on Funen, being the terminus for a handful of now closed railways:
 Nordfyenske Jernbane (NFJ, 1882–1966)
 Odense–Kerteminde–Martofte Jernbane (OKMJ, 1900–1966)
 Odense–Nørre Broby–Fåborg Jernbane (ONFJ, 1906–1954)
 Nordvestfyenske Jernbane (OMB, 1911–1966)

Services 
The stations offers services to Copenhagen, Esbjerg, Aarhus, Svendborg and international service to Hamburg (Germany).

Other 
The Danish Railway Museum is located in the roundhouse immediately north of Odense station.

See also 
 List of railway stations in Denmark

References

External links

 Odense Banegård Center

Buildings and structures in Odense
Railway stations in the Region of Southern Denmark
Railway stations opened in 1865
Transport infrastructure completed in 1914
Heinrich Wenck buildings
Transport in Odense
Railway stations in Denmark opened in the 19th century